John Wyndham Hamilton McCulloch (4 December 1894 – 21 October 1915) was an English first-class cricketer active 1913–14 who played for Middlesex. He was born in Calcutta; died in Bailleul, Nord, France during World War I.

References

1894 births
1915 deaths
English cricketers
Middlesex cricketers
British military personnel killed in World War I